Darb-e Chah (also Romanized as Darb-e Chāh) is a village in Dowreh Rural District, Chegeni District, Dowreh County, Lorestan Province, Iran. At the 2006 census, its population was 269, in 58 families.

References 

Towns and villages in Dowreh County